Sorgavasal is a 1954 Indian Tamil film,  directed by A. Kasilingam and produced by M. Somasundaram and M. K. Kaliapa. The film starred K. R. Ramasamy, Padmini, S. S. Rajendran and Anjali Devi in lead roles. The film had a musical score by Viswanathan–Ramamoorthy.

Cast
K. R. Ramasamy as Madivannan
Padmini as Queen Kumara Devi
S. S. Rajendran as Muthu Manikam
Anjali Devi as Thilagavathy
R. Balasubramaniam as Court Priest
P. S. Veerappa as King Verivelan

Trivia
C. N. Annadurai had written screenplay and dialogues for films earlier and was credited as Annadurai. But, for the first time, in this film he was credited as Arignar Anna. The song Aagum Neriyedhu was originally written as Asthigam Edhu, Naasthigam Edhu. The song was so recorded and released in records. When the film went to the censor board, they objected to these lines. So the lyricist Udumalai Narayana Kavi altered it as Aagum Neri Edhu, Aagaa Neri Edhu.

Soundtrack
The music was composed by Viswanathan–Ramamoorthy. Lyrics were by Udumalai Narayana Kavi. Singer is K. R. Ramasamy. Playback singers are Thiruchi Loganathan, Nagore E. M. Hanifa, P. Leela, Soolamangalam Rajalakshmi, T. V. Rathnam, M. S. Rajeswari & A. P. Komala.

References

External links
 
 
 

1954 films
1950s Tamil-language films
Films scored by Viswanathan–Ramamoorthy
Jupiter Pictures films